John R. Barbour (1 September 1890 – 15 July 1916) was a Scottish professional footballer who played as an inside right in the Scottish and English leagues for Queen's Park, Dundee and Preston North End.

Personal life 
Barbour attended Hutchesons' Grammar School and later worked in the audit office for a railway company, in addition to serving as a territorial. Barbour served as a lance corporal in the Highland Light Infantry during the First World War and was killed at High Wood during the Battle of the Somme on 15 July 1916. He is commemorated on the Thiepval Memorial.

Career statistics

Honours 
Preston North End

 Football League Second Division second-place promotion: 1914–15

References

1890 births
1916 deaths
Footballers from Glasgow
Scottish footballers
English Football League players
Association football inside forwards
Glasgow Perthshire F.C. players
British Army personnel of World War I
British military personnel killed in the Battle of the Somme
Highland Light Infantry soldiers
Queen's Park F.C. players
Dundee F.C. players
Preston North End F.C. players
Scottish Football League players
Scotland youth international footballers
People educated at Hutchesons' Grammar School
People from Gorbals
Military personnel from Glasgow